Lisa Schweizer (born 18 July 1995) is a German weightlifter. She represented Germany at the 2020 Summer Olympics in Tokyo, Japan.

She won the silver medal in her event at the 2022 European Weightlifting Championships held in Tirana, Albania.

References 

Living people
1995 births
German female weightlifters
Weightlifters at the 2020 Summer Olympics
Olympic weightlifters of Germany
Sportspeople from Schwedt
European Weightlifting Championships medalists
21st-century German women